John Cale: Inside the Dream Syndicate Volume 3, Stainless Gamelan or simply Stainless Gamelan (and sometimes incorrectly Stainless "Steel" Gamelan, after the first track on the album) is an album by John Cale, better known for his work as the violist and founding member of the Velvet Underground.

Description
It is the fourth and final album in a loose anthology released by the independent label Table of the Elements. It follows Sun Blindness Music, Day Of Niagara and Dream Interpretation.

Stainless Gamelan, along with the other albums in the trilogy, involves Cale during his tenure with the minimalist group Theatre of Eternal Music.

Track listing
"Stainless Steel Gamelan" - 10:25
"At About This Time Mozart Was Dead And Joseph Conrad Was Sailing The Seven Seas Learning English" - 26:30
"Terry's Cha-Cha" - 8:21
"After the Locust" - 4:20
"Big Apple Express" - 5:45

Personnel
John Cale – cembalet, wollensak, viola, electric piano
Sterling Morrison – guitar
Angus MacLise – percussions, tambourine
Terry Jennings – soprano saxophone
Tony Conrad – thunder machine

References 

Minimalistic compositions
John Cale compilation albums
Theatre of Eternal Music albums
2002 compilation albums